Circé was the lead boat of her class of two submarines built for the French Navy in the first decade of the 20th century.

Design and description
The Circé class were built as part of the French Navy's 1904 building program to a double-hull design by Maxime Laubeuf. The submarines displaced  surfaced and  submerged. Their crew numbered 2 officers and 20 enlisted men.

For surface running, the boats were powered by two German MAN  diesel engines, each driving one propeller shaft. When submerged each propeller was driven by a  electric motor.

The boats were armed with six external  torpedo launchers; four of these were fixed outwards at an angle of five degrees, two firing forward and two firing to the rear. The aft tubes were reversed in March 1911 so they too fired forward. The other launchers were a rotating pair of Drzewiecki drop collars in a single mount positioned on top of the hull at the stern. They could traverse 150 degrees to each side of the boat. A support for a  deck gun was ordered to be installed on 29 March 1911, but the gun itself was never fitted.

Construction and career
The Circé-class submarines were ordered on 8 October 1904. Calypso was laid down in 1905 at the Arsenal de Toulon, launched on 13 September 1907 and commissioned on 1 August 1909.

World War I
On 29 April 1915, Circé made several attempts to penetrate the harbour of Cattaro. Finally she gained entrance, but found no targets and had to retire.  On 31 March 1917 in the Adriatic Sea, she launched a torpedo towards the German submarine , but missed.

On 24 May 1917, under command of Lieutenant Hélion De Cambourg, she succeeded in sinking the German submarine . This was one of the few sinkings by a French submarine during World War I.

On 20 September 1918, Circé under command of Lt. Henri Viaud was on anti-submarine patrol in the Southern Adriatic Sea, off Cattaro, when she was torpedoed by the Austro-Hungarian Navy submarine  at 04:00, while recharging her batteries. Only one survivor was rescued.

Citations

Bibliography

External links
 La Circé on sous-marin.france
 
 Wrecksite
 Testimony of the only survivor Eugène Lapeyre

Circé-class submarine (1907)
World War I submarines of France
1907 ships
Ships sunk by Austro-Hungarian submarines
Maritime incidents in 1918
World War I shipwrecks in the Adriatic Sea
Submarines sunk by submarines